Çetin Zeybek (12 September 1932 - 10 November 1990) was a Turkish football midfielder who played for Turkey in the 1954 FIFA World Cup. He also played for Kasımpaşa S.K.

References

External links
 
 

1932 births
1990 deaths
People from Bandırma
Turkish footballers
Turkey international footballers
Association football midfielders
Kasımpaşa S.K. footballers
1954 FIFA World Cup players